The House of Savelli (de Sabellis in documents) were a rich and influential Roman aristocratic family who rose to prominence in the 13th century, the youngest is still alive today (1626–2022).

History 

The family, who held the lordship of Palombara Sabina, took their name from the rocca (castle) of Sabellum, near Albano, which had belonged to the counts of Tusculum before it passed to the Savelli. Early modern genealogies of the Savelli, such as the unpublished manuscript "eulogistic treatise" compiled by Onofrio Panvinio, drew connections to Pope Benedict II, a possible but undocumentable connection, and even to the cognomen Sabellius of Antiquity.

They provided at least two popes: Cencio Savelli, Pope Honorius III (1216–1227) and Giacomo Savelli, Honorius IV (1285–1287). His father, Luca Savelli, was a Roman senator and sacked the Lateran in 1234. Luca's decision to side with Emperor Frederick II against Honorius III's successor, Gregory, brought various material benefits to the family, including some fiefs in the Sabina region. Honorius' brother, Pandolfo Savelli, was the podestà of Viterbo in 1275.

Later members include the condottieri Silvio and Antonello Savelli. Savelli Cardinals include Giovanni Battista Savelli (1471 in pectore, 1480); Giacomo Savelli (1539); Silvio Savelli (1596); Giulio Savelli (1615); Fabrizio Savelli (1647); Paolo Savelli (1664); and Domenico Savelli (1853). The last member of the family left in Rome was Giulio Savelli, who died in 1712. A collateral line, the Giannuzzi Savelli ('Giannuzzi' adopted later on) represent descendants of Antonio Savelli of Rignano who moved to the Kingdom of Naples in 1421 to fight as a condottiero. The title  has been held in that family since Ercole Giannuzzi Savelli dei baroni di Pietramala inherited it in 1769 from his mother Ippolita Rota, last of her house. The republican patriot Luigi Giannuzzi Savelli dei principi di Cerenzia was shot 3 April 1799 by orders of Cardinal Ruffo, and the feudal lands of Prince Tommaso Giannuzzi Savelli of Cerenzia were confiscated: Cerenzia, Casino (Castelsilano) Montespinello (Spinello) Belvedere Malapezza, and Zinga.

By the 17th century, the Savelli had fallen on lean times. Castel Gandolfo had been relinquished under terms of Pope Clement VIII's "bull of the barons" to the Papal treasury in return for a mere 150,000 scudi in 1596, and in 1650 Albano, with its princely title, was turned over to the Savalli family.

Popes 

In brackets the year of the beginning and end of his pontificate:
 Pope Benedict II (684-685)
 Pope Gregory II (715-731)
 Pope Eugene II (824-827)
 Pope Honorius III (1216–1227)
 Pope Honorius IV (1285–1287)

Cardinals 
In parenthesis the year of nomination as a cardinal:
 Licinio Savelli (o Sabelli) (–first part of 1088)
 Bertrando Savelli (1216)
 Giovanni Battista Savelli (1480)
 Silvio Savelli (1596)
 Giulio Savelli (1615)
 Fabrizio Savelli (1647)
 Paolo Savelli (1664)
 Domenico Savelli (1853)

Military leaders and military men 

 Jacopo Savelli (...–1355) di parte guelfa
 Luca Savelli (...–1390) di parte guelfa
 Paolo Savelli (1350–1405)
 Evangelista Savelli (...–1462)
 Antonello Savelli (1450–1498)
 Giovanni Savelli (...–1498)
 Cristorforo Savelli (...–1500)
 Ludovico Savelli (...–1500)
 Onorio Savelli (...–1500)
 Troiano Savelli (...–1510)
 Mariano Savelli (...–1515)
 Paolo Savelli (...–1515)
 Battista Savelli (...–1513)
 Silvio Savelli (...–1515)
 Luca Savelli (...–1515)
 Antonio Savelli (...–1522)
 Jacopo Savelli (...–1525)
 Giovan Battista Savelli (1505–1551)
 Davide Savelli (...–1522)

Senatori di Roma 
 Luca Savelli (1266) e (1290), grandson of Cencio ossia Pope Honorius III
 Pandolfo Savelli (1287), brother of Giacomo ossia Pope Honorius IV

Notes

References 
 
 Litta, P. Le famiglie celebri italiane, Vol. X: "I Savelli di Roma" (Turin: Liverani) 1872.

 
People from Albano Laziale